The 1864 United States presidential election in West Virginia took place on November 8, 1864, as part of the 1864 United States presidential election. West Virginia voters chose five representatives, or electors, to the Electoral College, who voted for president and vice president. This was the first time that West Virginia participated in an election since gaining statehood.

West Virginia was won by the incumbent President Abraham Lincoln (R-Illinois), running with former Senator and Military Governor of Tennessee Andrew Johnson, with 68.24% of the popular vote, against the 4th Commanding General of the United States Army George B. McClellan (D–New Jersey), running with Representative George H. Pendleton, with 31.76% of the vote.

With 68.24% of the popular vote, West Virginia would prove to be Lincoln's fifth strongest state in terms of popular vote percentage after Kansas, Vermont, Massachusetts and Missouri.

Results

References

West Virginia
1864
1864 West Virginia elections